Orecta lycidas is a species of moth of the  family Sphingidae. It is known from Argentina, Paraguay, Brazil and Bolivia.

Adults have been recorded in September.

The larvae have been recorded feeding on Laurus nobilis and Nectandra venulosa.

Subspecies
Orecta lycidas lycidas (Brazil)
Orecta lycidas eos (Burmeister, 1878) (Argentina, Paraguay, Brazil and Bolivia)

References

Ambulycini
Moths described in 1875